More Than a Melody is the fourth studio album by gospel singer Yolanda Adams. The album includes singles such as "Gotta Have Love" (for which a commercial cassette single and video were both released) and a cover of the Steve Miller classic "Fly Like an Eagle". The album also includes musical collaborations with O'Landa Draper on "The Good Shepherd" and BeBe Winans on "What About the Children". The album was originally released on Tribute Records, and later re-released under the Verity label after Tribute's 1996 buyout.

Track listing 
Track information in source.
 "Open Arms" 4:06
 "Trust and Believe" 5:49
 "The Good Shepherd" 5:58
 "Gotta Have Love" 4:25
 "What About the Children?" 5:19
 "More Than a Melody" 4:57
 "My Desire" 4:42
 "Take Away" 5:07
 "Fly Like an Eagle" [Medley] 4:06
 "You Changed My Life" (duet with Doug Williams) 5:08

Charts

References

External links
 

1995 albums
Yolanda Adams albums